The Canton of Valais is subdivided into districts and municipalities.

There is one former district, namely Raron District, which got divided into Westlich Raron District, Östlich Raron District.

Districts

Valais is divided into 13 districts, represented by the 13 stars on the coat of arms of Valais:
 Brig with capital Brig-Glis
 Conthey with capital Conthey
 Entremont with capital Sembrancher
 Goms with capital Münster-Geschinen
 Hérens with capital Evolène
 Leuk with capital Leuk
 Martigny with capital Martigny
 Monthey with capital Monthey
 Saint-Maurice with capital Saint-Maurice
 Sierre with capital Sierre
 Sion with capital Sion
 Visp with capital Visp
 District Raron is divided into:
 Östlich Raron with capital Mörel-Filet
 Westlich Raron with capital Raron

Villages 
 

 Mayoux
 Vissoie

See also 
 :Category:Districts of Valais
 Municipalities of the canton of Valais